Hugo Moritz Anton Heinrich Freiherr von Obernitz (born April 16, 1819; died September 18, 1901, in Honnef) was a Prussian general who served as adjutant general of Kaiser Wilhelm I.

Biography
Hugo was the son of the Prussian Major Friedrich Karl Moritz von Obernitz and his wife Wilhelmine.

After attending cadet schools in Kulm and Berlin, Obernitz entered the 4th Infantry Regiment on August 18, 1836, as a second lieutenant. In 1852 he became captain and in 1856 he was promoted to major. In June 1861 he was promoted to lieutenant colonel and from the spring of 1863 he was commander of the Guards Fusilier Regiment. On June 6, 1865, he was appointed a member of the study commission of the war academy in Berlin. During the Austro-Prussian War, he led the 1st Guards Infantry Brigade as part of the 2nd Army in the battles of Soor and Königinhof against the Austrians. In the decisive Battle of Königgrätz on July 3, his troops captured 40 cannons and the town of Chlum. For this, Obernitz was awarded the Pour le Mérite in September 1866 and was promoted to major general. From 1868 to 1871 he was an inspector of hunters and marksmen.

On September 29, 1866, Obernitz was promoted to major general. From 1868 to 1871 he was a military inspector.

He was commander of the Württemberg Field Division in the Franco-Prussian War, fighting in the Battle of Wörth and, as part of the II Corps under the command of General Eduard von Fransecky, participated in the Siege of Paris. Obernitz received a grant of 100,000 Thalers for these services. On October 22, 1871, he became commander of the 14th Division in Düsseldorf. On June 11, 1879, he was appointed commander of the XIV Corps in Karlsruhe. Meanwhile, in June 1879 he was promoted to General of the Infantry and on March 22, 1884, he was appointed chief of the 4th (3rd East Prussian) Grenadier Regiment "King Frederick the Great". On August 18, 1886, he celebrated his fiftieth anniversary of service.

After his retirement in 1888, he and his wife Anna Friederike Ida Bertha, née von Usedom, bought a villa in Bad Honnef. They had several children, among them:

Friedrich Wilhelm Viktor Moritz Ferdinand (1860-1909) - Prussian statesman;
Arthur Rudolf Eduard (born 1873) - Prussian military major.

Hugo von Obernitz died on September 18, 1901, in Bad Honnef and was buried in the Alter Friedhof cemetery. Later, his wife was buried next to him. In the cemetery you can still see the tombstone of Hugo von Obernitz, whose bronze Prussian eagle was stolen in 1988.

Honours and awards

Notes

References

Sources
 Hugo von Obernitz, General, Kommandeur der Württ.
 Kurt von Priesdorff: Soldatisches Führertum, Band 8, Hanseatische Verlagsanstalt Hamburg, S. 69–73.
 "The siege operations in the campaign against France, 1870-71."
 Stuttgarter Ehrenbürger von 1850 bis 1900 

1819 births
1901 deaths
German military personnel of the Franco-Prussian War
Prussian people of the Austro-Prussian War
Generals of Infantry (Prussia)
Prussian Army personnel
People from East Prussia
Recipients of the Pour le Mérite (military class)
Recipients of the Iron Cross (1870), 2nd class
Recipients of the Military Merit Cross (Mecklenburg-Schwerin), 1st class
Recipients of the Order of St. George of the Fourth Degree
Recipients of the Order of the White Eagle (Russia)